The Jieț is a left tributary of the river Jiul de Est in Romania. It discharges into the Jiul de Est in Petrila. Its source is in the Parâng Mountains.

Tributaries

The following rivers are tributaries to the river Jieț (source to mouth):

Left: Slivei, Burtan, Dăncilă, Țiganu, Mija Mică, Mija Mare, Voislava
Right: Ghereș, Coasta lui Rus, Groapa Seacă, Fometescu

References

Rivers of Romania
Rivers of Hunedoara County